The Mazarine Stakes is a Thoroughbred horse race at Woodbine Racetrack in Toronto, Ontario, Canada. A Grade III race, it is open to two-year-old fillies. Contested over a distance of  miles (8.5 furlongs) on Polytrack synthetic dirt, it currently carries a purse of approximately $114,045.

Run annually in October, the Mazarine Stakes is a prep race for the Breeders' Cup Juvenile Fillies.

Inaugurated in 1965 at Greenwood Raceway, in 1980 it was moved to its present location at Woodbine Racetrack. From 1975 through 1979 it was contested at a distance of one mile (8 furlongs). It was run in two divisions in 1979.

Records
Speed  record: 
 1:43.15 - Knights Templar (2005) (at current distance of  miles)

Most wins by an owner:
 4 - Sam-Son Farm (1986, 1990, 1995, 1999)

Most wins by a jockey:
 7 - Patrick Husbands (2003, 2004, 2007, 2012, 2013, 2014, 2017)

Most wins by a trainer:
 9 - Mark E. Casse (2004, 2007, 2012, 2013, 2014, 2016, 2017, 2021, 2022)

Winners of the Mazarine Stakes

* In 1983, Constant Change finished first but was disqualified and set back to second.

See also
Road to the Kentucky Oaks
 List of Canadian flat horse races

References
The 2007 Mazarine Breeders' Cup Stakes at the NTRA
The Mazarine Breeders' Cup Stakes at Pedigree Query

Graded stakes races in Canada
Flat horse races for two-year-old fillies
Recurring sporting events established in 1965
Woodbine Racetrack